Helen Reddy is the second studio album by Australian-American pop singer Helen Reddy, released on November 8, 1971, by Capitol Records. Reddy's selections include tracks by singer-songwriters Carole King, John Lennon, Randy Newman, and Donovan. It debuted on Billboard magazine's Top LP's chart in the issue dated December 4, 1971, and had a seven-week chart run in which it got as high as number 167. On March 29, 2005, the album was released for the first time on compact disc as one of two albums on one CD, the other album being I Don't Know How to Love Him, Reddy's debut LP that originally came out in the spring of 1971.



Single
Billboard'''s December 4, 1971, issue also marked the first appearance of the single from the album, "No Sad Song", on the magazine's Hot 100, where it spent eight weeks and peaked at number 62, and the December 25 issue, three weeks later, began the song's four weeks on the Easy Listening chart, where it reached number 32. It also reached number 51 on the pop chart in Canada's RPM magazine.

ReceptionThe Village Voice critic Robert Christgau chose to highlight "a scathing death-of-a-cocksman song that Carole King somehow left off Music, a John Lennon autotherapy that sounds inquisitive instead of foolish, and a frolicsome sisterhood ditty that [Reddy] wrote herself." Joe Viglione of AllMusic retrospectively describes the album as "a pleasant listening experience, though it was the only one of her early albums not to find representation on her Greatest Hits. Because there was no big hit on the record, it is not as well-known as her other recordings, but it definitely has charm and is an essential part of her collection of music."

Track listing
Side 1
 "Time" (Paul Parrish) – 3:38 
Leland Sklar – bass 
Ron Tutt – drums 
 Paul Parrish – piano 
 "How?" (John Lennon) – 3:33
Nick DeCaro –  string arrangement 
Jerry Scheff –  bass 
Ron Tutt – drums 
Craig Doerge – piano 
Tom Hensley – piano 
 "Come on John" (David Blue) – 4:21
Jerry Scheff –  bass 
Ron Tutt – drums 
Craig Doerge – piano 
Tom Hensley – piano 
David Cohen – guitar 
 "Summer of '71" (Jack Conrad, Helen Reddy) – 2:36
 Jack Conrad – bass 
John Guerin – drums 
Dennis Budimir – guitar 
David Cohen – guitar 
 "I Don't Remember My Childhood" (Leon Russell) – 3:32
Nick DeCaro –  string arrangement 
Larry Knechtel – piano 

Side 2
 "No Sad Song" (Carole King, Toni Stern) – 3:11
Nick DeCaro – accordion 
Ron Tutt – drums 
David Cohen – guitar 
Larry Carlton –  mandolin 
 "I Think It's Going to Rain Today" (Randy Newman) – 2:27
Bob Thompson – arranger 
 "Tulsa Turnaround" (Larry Collins, Alex Harvey) – 3:24
Joe Osborn – bass 
Ron Tutt – drums 
Larry Carlton – electric guitar 
Tom Hensley – piano 
Sneaky Pete Kleinow – steel guitar 
 "More Than You Could Take" (Helen Reddy) – 2:41
Jerry Scheff –  bass 
Ron Tutt – drums 
Dean Parks – guitar 
John Brennan – guitar 
 "New Year's Resovolution" (Donovan) – 3:40
Leland Sklar – bass 
Russ Kunkel – drums 
John Brennan – guitar 
Larry Carlton –guitar 
David Cohen – guitar 
Milt Holland – percussion 

French version of "No Sad Song"

In 2009 EMI Music Special Markets released Rarities from the Capitol Vaults'', a 12-track CD of mostly what were previously unreleased Reddy recordings, which included "Plus De Chansons Tristes", the French version of "No Sad Song" that was only released in France.

Charts

Personnel
Helen Reddy – vocals
Larry Marks – producer
Hugh Davies – engineer
John Hoernle – art direction
Don Peterson – photography
DeBlasio & Wald, Inc. – management

Notes

References

 

1971 albums
Capitol Records albums
Helen Reddy albums
Albums recorded at Capitol Studios